Zamušani (in older sources also Samožani) is a settlement in the Municipality of Gorišnica in northeastern Slovenia. The area traditionally belonged to the Styria region. It is now included in the Drava Statistical Region.

There is a T-shaped Neo-Gothic chapel-shrine in the settlement. It was built in 1929.

The railway line from Pragersko to Čakovec runs through the settlement.

References

External links
Zamušani on Geopedia

Populated places in the Municipality of Gorišnica